V-Blocks are precision metalworking jigs typically used to hold round metal rods or pipes for performing drilling or milling operations. They consist of a rectangular steel or cast iron block with a 120 degree channel rotated 45-degrees from the sides, forming a V-shaped channel in the top. A small groove is cut in the bottom of the "V". They often come with screw clamps to hold the work.  There are also versions with internal magnets for magnetic work-holding. V-blocks are usually sold in pairs.

External links

 How to make a V-block

Boilermaking
Metalworking
The inventor of an improved magnetic V-block was Harold Arlington Spanker
http://patentimages.storage.googleapis.com/pdfs/US2449255.pdf